Lindsay Keable (born 11 June 1988) is an English netball player who plays for England and for London Pulse in the positions of goal defence or goal keeper . 

She completed her education at Moulsham High School, in Chelmsford, Essex. She was previously the vice captain of the Saracens Mavericks for the 2019 Netball Superleague season along with the captain Sasha Corbin.</ref>

References 

1988 births
Living people
Celtic Dragons players
English netball players
London Pulse players
Mavericks netball players
Netball Superleague players
Team Bath netball players